Toyboldi, also Toy Boldi; or from Mandarin Tuoyi Baoledi (Tuoyibaoledi ) is a town in Xayar County (Shayar, Shaya), Aksu Prefecture, Xinjiang, China.


Name
Toyboldi is Uyghur for 'festivity'. The village from which the town takes its name was formerly called Tuoyibao which is an abbreviation for Tuoyibo'erdi. The village has also been called Tuoyiboluoduo.

History
In 1845, Lin Zexu inspected agricultural cultivation efforts in Toyboldi village or a nearby village of the same name further east.

In 1958, Toyboldi Commune was established.

In 1984, Toyboldi Commune became Toyboldi Township.

Between May and June 2016, Zhang Shufeng, Xayar County education department vice party secretary and director, used public funds on six occasions to hold dinner parties for a rural tourism organization at the Toyboldi Town Central School. Zhang was later stripped of his position due to the incident combined with other problems.

Geography

Administrative Divisions
Toyboldi includes twenty-five villages:

Villages (Mandarin Chinese Hanyu Pinyin-derived names except where Uyghur is provided):
Tuoyibaoledi 
Kejimata
Terek (Tiereke, Tierekecun;  / ) 
Kuonatiereke
Paizi'awati
Serimake (Seri Makecun) , Aimai'er Sabi'er party secretary (2018)
Kona chimen (Kuonaqiman;  / )
Yingqiman
Yaleguzitiereke (Yaleguzi Tierekecun) 
Talekebulong (Taleke Bulongcun) 
Langan (Langancun) 
Yingyiganqi
Yingkuokebuyun
Segezileke
Shengli (Shenglicun) 
Kumu'airike (Kumu Airikecun) 
Kalakumu 
Akelike
Yinongchang
Ernongchang (Ernongchangcun) 
Sannongchang (Sannongchangcun) 
Sinongchang (Sinongchangcun, No. 4 Farm) 
Yuanyichang
Salasiti (Salasiticun) 
Aketamu

Former village:
 Yingbage

Economy
The main agricultural products of the town are wheat, corn, and cotton. Money making products include fennel and pijiuhua. Animal husbandry and fish farming are common in the surrounding area. The area is one of the main producers of sanbeiyang lambskin. A farmer's market is held on Tuesdays.

Demographics

, 74.7% of the population of Toyboldi was Uyghur and 22.5% was Han Chinese.

Transportation
In the mid-1990s, a metalled road was built linking Toyboldi (Toy Boldi) to the county seat.

References

Populated places in Xinjiang
Township-level divisions of Xinjiang